Eupogonius annulicornis is a species of beetle in the family Cerambycidae. It was described by Fisher in 1926. It is known from Cuba and the United States.

References

Eupogonius
Beetles described in 1926